Gustave "Gust" Constantine Zarnas (December 16, 1913 – December 26, 2000) was a college football All-American and professional football player. He is distinguished as being the first Greek to play in the National Football League.

Born in Ikaria, Greece, Zarnas came to America with his parents. He played the guard position at the Ohio State University from 1935 to 1937 and received All-American recognition his last year as a Buckeye. At , 220 lbs., Zarnas played professionally in the NFL for the Chicago Bears and Green Bay Packers from 1938 to 1940, and enlisted into the United States Navy becoming a lieutenant during World War II. He was inducted into the College Football Hall of Fame in 1975.

External links
 
 

1913 births
2000 deaths
American football guards
Brooklyn Dodgers (NFL) players
Chicago Bears players
College Football Hall of Fame inductees
Greek emigrants to the United States
Greek players of American football
Green Bay Packers players
Ohio State Buckeyes football players
United States Navy personnel of World War II
United States Navy officers
People from Icaria
Sportspeople from the North Aegean